William Griffith may refer to:

Politicians
 William Griffith (born 1480) (1480–1545), Weslsh politician
 William Griffith (MP fl.1586), MP for Caernarvon Boroughs (UK Parliament constituency)
 William Griffith (MP fl.1597), MP for Caernarvonshire (UK Parliament constituency)
 William Griffith (1620–1688), Welsh Member of Parliament for Caernarvon (UK Parliament constituency)
 William Griffith (1686–1715), Welsh Member of Parliament for Caernarvon and Caernarvonshire
 William Griffith (US politician), see United States House of Representatives elections, 2006

Sports
 William "Billy" Griffith (1880–1949), Australian rules footballer
 William Griffith (canoeist) (born 1947), Canadian canoeist
 William Griffith (cricketer) (1871-1948), South African cricketer
 Stewart Cathie "Billy" Griffith (1914–1993), English cricketer

Others
 William Griffith (New Jersey attorney) (1766–1826), briefly served as a United States federal judge
 William Griffith (astronomer) (born 1956), Californian amateur astronomer
 William Griffith (botanist) (1810–1845)
 William Henry Jackson "Bill" Griffith (born 1944), American cartoonist

See also
 William Griffiths (disambiguation)